

This is a list of speakers of the People's Consultative Assembly, the bicameral legislature of Indonesia. The list does not include chairs of the Central Indonesian National Committee. From 1960 to 1971 the assembly was named the Provisional People's Consultative Assembly.

Key:

See also 
 People's Consultative Assembly
 List of Deputy Speakers of the People's Consultative Assembly
 List of Speakers of the People's Representative Council
 List of Speakers of the Regional Representative Council

Notes

Bibliography

References 

Lists of legislative speakers
Lists of political office-holders in Indonesia